Miss Santa Catarina is a Brazilian Beauty pageant which selects the representative for the State of Santa Catarina at the Miss Brazil contest. The pageant was created in 1955 and has been held every year since with the exception of 1990–1991, and 1993. The pageant is held annually with representation of several municipalities. Since 2021, the State director of Miss Santa Catarina is, Marcelo Sóes.

The following women from who competed as Miss Santa Catarina have won Miss Brazil:

Vera Fischer, from Blumenau, in 1969
Ingrid Budag, from Blumenau, in 1975
, from Gaspar, in 1988
, from Joinville, in 2002, following the resignation of the original winner
Carina Schlichting Beduschi, from Florianópolis, in 2005

Gallery of Titleholders

Titleholders

Table Notes

References

External links
Official Miss Brasil Website

Women in Brazil
Santa Catarina
Miss Brazil state pageants